Country Side is the sixth studio album by Canadian country music artist Jason Blaine. It was released on October 23, 2015 via E1 Entertainment. It include the singles "Country Side", "Travelin' Light", "Spotlight", "Dance with My Daughter" and "Back to You".

Track listing

Chart performance

Singles

ACurrent single.

References

2015 albums
Jason Blaine albums
E1 Music albums